Aglaomorpha bonii is a species of subtropical fern native to Southeast Asia. Growing as an epiphyte or lithophyte, its rhizome is covered in dry, paper-like fronds while the larger fronds are fertile and bear spores. This fern has long been used in traditional medicine in Vietnam to treat a variety of ailments, and in scientific research, compounds from the plant have demonstrated antibacterial and antioxidant properties.

References

External links 
 

bonii
Plants described in 1910